Pedro Alonso López (born 8 October 1948), also known as The Monster of the Andes, is a Colombian serial killer, child rapist and fugitive who murdered a minimum of 110 victims, mostly young women and girls, from 1969 to 1980 and claimed to have murdered over 300 victims across Colombia, Peru and Ecuador. 

Born into poverty in Colombia, López was initially imprisoned for auto theft in 1969, during which he claimed he was brutally gang-raped by a group of fellow inmates, whom he killed in retaliation. Upon his release from prison, López travelled extensively throughout South America, and during this period he claimed to have murdered hundreds of girls throughout Peru and Colombia. He was briefly captured by an Ayacuchoan indigenous tribe in Peru, but an American missionary convinced the tribe to hand him over to the authorities, who released López soon after.

López was ultimately arrested in Ecuador in 1980 after attempting to abduct a 12-year-old girl. For murders committed in Ecuador, López was sentenced to 16 years in prison, the maximum penalty for murder in Ecuador at the time. Released from prison in Ecuador in 1994, after which he was deported to and institutionalized in Colombia, López was released from psychiatric care in 1998, and is currently a wanted fugitive in connection with a murder committed in 2002. As of 2023, López's whereabouts remain unknown.

Early life
Pedro Alonso López was born in Colombia in 1948, in the municipality of Venadillo, Tolima. Within six months of his birth his mother moved to Santa Isabel. Pedro López was the seventh of thirteen children born to Benilda López de Castañeda, a prostitute, and had a difficult childhood due to the violence of the household and the absence of a father figure. His father, Megdardo Reyes, was murdered six months before his birth.

López was banished from the house at age nine, when his mother caught him attempting to molest his sister. Homeless, López wandered the streets of Bogotá and was frequently sexually abused. At age twelve, he was adopted by an American immigrant family, but fled after he was sexually assaulted by a teacher.

In 1969, López was sentenced to seven years in prison for auto theft. During this period of incarceration, he was brutally gang-raped by four other inmates. Days later, López hunted down the inmates and killed them in retaliation. The killings were ruled as self-defense, and two years were added to his sentence.

Murders
Upon his release from prison in 1978, López began drifting throughout the northwestern area of South America, eventually arriving in Peru. He later claimed that, during this period, he had killed over 100 girls, mainly street children and from indigenous tribes. While these claims are unverifiable, it is known that López was briefly captured by an Ayacuchoan indigenous tribe in south-central Peru after attempting to abduct a 9-year-old girl. The Ayacuchoans stripped López of his clothes and belongings and buried him in the sand.  However, an American missionary convinced the tribe to release López and turn him over to the police. The police did not detain López, and he was instead expelled from the country.

After his deportation from Peru, López resumed travelling throughout South America, and although authorities began to notice an increase of missing persons, more specifically young girls, throughout areas where he travelled, they concluded the disappearances were most likely cases of human trafficking.

In April 1980, the areas surrounding Ambato, Ecuador were hit by flash flooding, unearthing the remains of several young girls who had been previously reported missing. This revelation prompted the police to reopen their investigations and contributed towards López's ultimate arrest later that same year.

Arrest and confession
Not long after the flooding, a local woman named Carvina Poveda was on her way to the market with her 12-year-old daughter Marie when López attempted to abduct Marie. Local merchants were able to overpower López and hold him until the police arrived.

While in police custody after his arrest, López initially refused to cooperate during his interrogation, choosing to remain silent.  Eventually though, López began to confess his crimes to Police Captain Pastor Cordova, who had been placed in the same cell as López posing as a prisoner.

López had boasted that in total, he had murdered “Over two hundred in Ecuador, some tens in Peru and many more in Colombia,”He described his modus operandi as first luring the victim away from public spaces with a trinket, before raping and strangling them with his bare hands. 
 He additionally claimed that he would occasionally exhume the victim's bodies from their burial site and have 'tea parties' with them.  When asked about his motive for the murders, López reportedly said: “I lost my innocence at age of eight. So I decided to do the same to as many girls as I could.”  Soon after his confession, he directed the authorities to the bodies of 53 victims, and his confessions soon led to the confirmation of a total of 110 in Ecuador. 

Later in 1980, López was convicted of murder and sentenced to 16 years in prison, the maximum prison sentence available in Ecuador at the time.

Imprisonment and release
According to CNN, López "was arrested in 1980, but was freed by the government in Ecuador at the end of [1998]." In an interview from his prison cell, López described himself as "the man of the century" and said he was being released for "good behavior". An A&E Biography documentary reported that he was released from an Ecuadorian prison on 31 August 1994, then rearrested as an illegal immigrant and handed over to Colombian authorities, who charged him with a 20-year-old murder. He was declared insane and held in the psychiatric wing of a Bogotá hospital. In 1998, he was declared sane and released on $50 bail, subject to certain conditions. He later absconded. The same documentary says that Interpol released an advisory for his rearrest by Colombian authorities over a fresh murder in 2002, and he is currently wanted by the police. His whereabouts are unknown as of 2002.

Coverage
The 2006 edition of the Guinness World Records credited Lopez as being the "most prolific serial killer". The listing was removed after complaints that it made a competition out of murder.

See also
 List of fugitives from justice who disappeared
 List of serial killers in Colombia
 List of serial killers by number of victims

References

1948 births
1970s murders in Colombia
1970s murders in Ecuador
1970s murders in Peru
1980s murders in Colombia
1980s murders in Ecuador
1980s murders in Peru
1983 murders in Ecuador
1985 murders in Colombia
2002 murders in Colombia
20th-century criminals
Child sexual abuse in Colombia
Child sexual abuse in Ecuador
Colombian murderers of children
Colombian people convicted of murder
Colombian people imprisoned abroad
Colombian prisoners sentenced to life imprisonment
Colombian rapists
Colombian serial killers
Male serial killers
People convicted of murder by Colombia
People convicted of murder by Ecuador
People from Tolima Department
Possibly living people
Vigilantism against sex offenders
Violence against women in South America